The following is a list of episodes from the TV series Hercules.

All major voice actors from the 1997 film reprise their roles, except for Zeus and Philoctetes who are voiced in the series by Corey Burton and Robert Costanzo, respectively. The syndicated series and One Saturday Morning run ran 65 episodes and a direct-to-video film Hercules: Zero to Hero.

One episode serves as a crossover with Disney's Aladdin.

Series overview

Episodes

Season 1 (1998–99)
What follows is the list of Hercules episodes that aired in syndication.

Season 2 (1998–99)
What follows is the list of Hercules episodes that aired on the ABC television network.

Notes

External links
 
 
 Hercules at the Disney website
 
 Episode Guide

Lists of American children's animated television series episodes
Lists of Disney Channel television series episodes
Episodes